The 2013–14 CHL season was the 22nd season of the Central Hockey League (CHL). It was the last season of the CHL, as the league ceased operations in October 2014 after only seven teams remained. Allen, Brampton, Missouri, Quad City, Rapid City, Tulsa, and Wichita were accepted as expansion teams into the ECHL.

League business
The Laredo Bucks were moved to St. Charles, Missouri to rejoin the league as the St. Charles Chill
The CHL gets its first Canadian franchise as the Brampton Beast join the league as an expansion team
The Bloomington Blaze moved to the Southern Professional Hockey League, becoming the Bloomington Thunder
The Fort Worth Brahmas folded and were replaced by a North American Hockey League team

Regular season

Standings

x indicates team has clinched playoff spot

Final 2013–14 regular-season standings

Playoffs

Playoff bracket

Awards

All-CHL selections
Source:

References

External links
Central Hockey League website

     
2013-14
2013–14 in American ice hockey by league
2013–14 in Canadian ice hockey by league